The Shrine at Odero Lal,also spelt Udero Lal, is a joint Muslim-Hindu shrine located in the village of Odero Lal, near the city of Tando Adam Khan in the Pakistani province of Sindh. The shrine is notable as it is jointly used for worship by members of both faiths, while both communities also display reverence for the nearby Indus River at the shrine.

Background
Sindhi Muslims believe the saint interred at the shrine is Sheikh Tahir . Hindus also revere the interred saint as Odero Lal, but offer a different explanation for his origins. Hindus also refer to the saint in the shrine as Jhulelal. It forms the seat of the Daryapanthis, originally a sub-sect of the followers of Gorakhnath, who belong to the Nath tradition. Both communities also refer to the saint by the alternate and religiously-neutral term Zinda Pir, or "The Living Saint."

The complex is home to both a Muslim shrine and Hindu temple. The joint arrangement was devised as a compromise to stem any conflict that might arise regarding by which religious tradition the corpse should be disposed of.

Worship 
The shrine caretakers hail from both the Muslim and Hindu communities. In the evening, Muslims offer namaz prayers at the shrine while Hindus perform aarti and puja prayers. At the temple, a lamp is kept burning perpetually. On the new moon days, lamps are lighted and the shrine deity, an avatar of Varuna, is worshipped at the nearby river, or other water bodies, with rice, sugar-candy, spices and fruits.

Significance

For Muslims
According to Muslim tradition, Sheikh Tahir was born as a Hindu by the name of Odero Lal (alternatively spelled Udero Lal), but converted to Islam as a teenager. Odero Lal in his youth was said to have been fiercely opposed to the Hindu caste system, and as a result, attracted the attention of a Sufi saint from Multan, whose association then lead Odero Lal to convert to Islam and adopt the name Sheikh Tahir.

For Hindus
Hindus commonly refer to Odero Lal as Jhulelal. According to Hindu tradition, a tyrannical ruler named Mirkh Shah from nearby Thatta ordered that local Hindus convert to Islam within 24 hours. Local Hindus, fearful of this edict, prayed at the banks of the Indus River, where they then saw a vision of the Hindu deity Varuna who informed the worshippers that he would re-incarnate himself as an infant to be born in Naserpur in order to deliver them from their hardships.

The baby Jhulelal was then born on the first day of the Hindu month of Chaitra. Upon hearing of the infant's birth, Mirkh Shah commanded a Hindu minister named Ahirio to kill the infant with a poisoned rose petal. When Ahirio saw the infant, Jhulelal smiled and the poisoned rose petal blew out of Ahirio's possession. When Ahirio caught sight of Jhulelal for a second time, he was startled to see that the infant had grown into an elderly man. The elderly man was then said to have turned into a young man, and then a warrior on horseback before Ahirio's eyes.

Ahirio returned to recount the story to Mirkh Shah, who then lambasted Ahirio, and told him to leave and call out for Jhulelal in villages and by the banks of the Indus River.  Upon calling for Jhulelal, the warrior on horseback appeared out of the river to appear to Ahirio with an accompanying army. Terrified, Ahirio begged Jhulelal to restrain his army. Jhulelal's army then disappeared back into the river, while Ahirio went back to the palace to recount the story to Mirkh Shah. Mirkh Shah remained skeptical, but invited Jhulelal to his court with intent to forcefully convert Jhulelal. Jhulelal is then said to have vanished, leaving Mirkh Shah enraged. Mirkh Shah then ordered that all Hindus immediately convert to Islam. The Hindus then rushed to the house in Nasirpur where Jhulelal was born, and found Jhulelal there as an infant. The infant consoled the distraught Hindus and commanded them to assemble at a temple near the Indus River. Upon assembling, a firestorm broke out and engulfed Mirkh Shah's palaces. The king escaped to the banks of the river, where he found Jhulelal, now again a warrior,  and his Hindu followers protected from the firestorm. The king fell at Jhulelal's feet, and Jhulelal dismissed the storm with the movement of his hand.

Jhulelal is also believed by Sindhi Hindus to have performed miracles, such as entering the Indus river at Nasirpur, and coming up at Bukkur, at the northernmost extent of Sindh.

References

Mausoleums in Sindh
Religious buildings and structures in Sindh
Sufi shrines in Pakistan
Tourist attractions in Sindh